Krišjānis Valdemārs was an icebreaker of the Ministry of Trade and Industry of the Republic of Latvia from 1926 to 1941. It was designed to clear shipping lanes from the ice in the freezing port of Riga, but was also used for escorting the President and members of the government on foreign visits.

Description

History 
The ship was ordered in 1924–1925 by the Latvian government and built at Glasgow Shipyard. The icebreaker was given the name of the spiritual leader of The First Latvian National Awakening and the most prominent member of the Young Latvians movement Krišjānis Valdemārs (1825–1891). Krišjānis Valdemārs sailed on January 13, 1926 on its first voyage from the port of Riga.
The first captain of the icebreaker was Kārlis Cērpe (1875–1931). After his death Captain Fricis Veidners (1883–1942) and Pēteris Maurītis (1887–?) succeeded in command. After the Soviet occupation of Latvia in 1940 the ship was nationalized. At the end of August 1941 Krišjānis Valdemārs took part in Soviet evacuation of Tallinn to Kronstadt, but struck a naval mine on August 28 and sunk. Krišjānis Valdemārs, loaded with cargo, was bombed and sunk in the Gulf of Finland by Junkers Ju 88 aircraft of Kampfgeschwader 77, Luftwaffe.

Finding the wreck 

See also 
 Latvian Mercantile Marine during World War II

References 

Ships of Latvia
Icebreakers of Latvia
Shipwrecks in the Gulf of Finland
Ships sunk by mines
World War II shipwrecks in the Baltic Sea
Icebreakers of the Soviet Union